Devi Putrudu is a 2001 Indian Telugu-language fantasy-drama film written and produced by M. S. Raju under the Sumanth Art Productions banner, directed by Kodi Ramakrishna. It stars Venkatesh, Soundarya and Anjala Zaveri, with music composed by Mani Sharma. The film was not commercially successful. It was dubbed and released into Tamil as Paapa.

Plot
The movie begins with a voice explaining the submersion of Dwaraka village in the sea because of a huge tsunami, then jumps to 5000 years ahead and starts with Krishna Venkatesh, doing pranks in Bombay and making a living with petty thefts. Satyavathi Anjala Zaveri is a foreign returned girl and she learns that her elder sister Karuna married an archaeologist when she visits the archaeological site of Dwaraka. Satyavathi decides to visit Dwaraka to meet her sister. As Satyavathi comes out of the airport in Bombay to go to Dwaraka along with her uncle M. S. Narayana, Krishna meets her as the taxi driver, thinking that she has valuable diamonds with her. On the way, he realizes that she is not the one who was supposed to have carried diamonds and decides to dump her and come back to Bombay. But destiny has other plans. This makes Krishna go to Dwaraka. There he gets chased by some baddies after eating in a hotel. After escaping the baddies, he meets up with a cute little girl called Paapa. She has mystical powers, she knows that he had fallen in love with Satyavathi and asks him to tell to her. One day, Sathya tells Krishna about her sister after she is saved by Krishna, he tells Sathya that he will find the mystery of her sister's missing. Things turn spooky when he enters her sister's house. Suddenly, Paapa, the cute little girl whom he had met before appears in front of him, she tells him about the history and mystery of the house.

Balaram Venkatesh was an atheist. He believes more in the power of science than that of God. There he meets up with a damsel called Karuna and they fall in love, get married and Karuna gets pregnant. There used to be a kind of catastrophe in the sea adjoining the Dwaraka every Mahalaya Amavasya, which generates a huge amount of torque. Balaram believes that there is a mystery behind that strange thing in the sea. With unremitting attention to his purpose and frustrated by the lack of initiative on the part of the government, he jumps into the sea during one Amavasya and comes back with a huge archaic metal box that has all kinds of marks and an embossed Trishulam (trident). There is a bunch of foreigners headed by Rahul Dev who are after that mystical box. One day, the box opens itself and Balaram sees that and realizes that it is not an ordinary metal box, but a storehouse of a mysterious force that would destroy the world if not put back in its place. But the baddies, who want to have power over the universe, did not allow him. They torture both Balaram and Karuna asking them to give them the box. In the meantime, Balaram brings the box to put it back in its place but gets a phone call from the foreigner to bring the box back if he wants to save his wife. In the state of shock that his wife is in danger, the box falls into a cave. Yet he rushes back to his house to save his wife but realizes that his friend Suresh has also joined hands with the foreigner. This leads to a fight in which Balaram is killed after he falls off a hill. Before his death, he tells his wife the location of the box and asks her to put it back in its place.

Krishna now owes revenge against them and fools them into getting Karuna out of the foreigner's den. He rushes to the cave along with all others to find the case. But the foreigners arrive and again there is a fight. In the meantime, the foreigners try to escape with the box, but they are stopped by the girl Paapa. They use the help of a Fakir to get rid of her. The Fakir imprisons the girl in a small bottle. Again, Krishna arrives and makes the trio along with the box fall off a cliff, but they end up surviving. Before Krishna can recover, the trio (the foreigner, the Fakir, and Balaram's friend) fight for the box. The box itself opens and a goddess in her most angry state comes out and kills the trio and their people and goes back into the box. The box is then shown to be put back in its rightful place by Krishna and the other people. The dog Striker brings the bottle with the girl in it, but the girl is sucked back to the afterlife's place (heaven or hell). The film ends with the birth of a baby between Krishna and Sathya, which had the same birthmark as that of the girl Paapa.

Cast

 Venkatesh as Balaram & Krishna (Dual role)
 Soundarya as Karuna
 Anjala Zaveri as Satyavati
 Suresh as Har Gopal
 Kota Srinivasa Rao as Dheyyala Raju (Wizard)
 M. S. Narayana as Peddagaddala Peraiah
 Ali as 
 Babu Mohan as Security Guard
 Ahuti Prasad as Elchuri
 Raghunatha Reddy as Satyavati's father
 Nawab Shah as St. Aom
 Prema as Goddess
 Abu Salim
 Bhupinder Singh
 Madhu 
 Bank Vijay 
 Raman Punjabi 
 Echuri 
 K. R. J. Sarma 
 Indu Anand 
 Baby Cherri as Balaram's daughter

Soundtrack

Music composed by Mani Sharma. Music released on ADITYA Music Company.
Telugu version

Tamil version
Lyrics - Vaali
Kanne Kannadi - Unnikrishnan, Sujatha
Onna Renda - Sukhwinder Singh, Swarnalatha
Oruvan - Shankar Mahadevan
Alai Kadalil - Kalpana
Singaram Konja - SPB, Sujatha

Box office 
The film had completed 50 days in 60 centres and 100 days in 3 centres. Nizam got the distribution rights with a record breaking price, 5 crore, which was highest at that time. But, the Nizam distributors incurred a loss of 3 crore.

Reception 
M. S. Raju in an interview with idlebrain said, "I preferred my hero Venkatesh for the project conceptualized Devi Putrudu. It is a film, which could only be made with directors like Steven Spielberg and George Lucas. The story of the film was wonderful and I became emotional and started that project. After starting the project I realized the depth, duration and budget. Then we realized that it would take 10 years to make. Hence we wound up the film and released it. The film became a flop and my position was back to square one. I had to compensate my buyers, my finances and my ego, very dearly".

References

External links
 

2001 films
2000s Telugu-language films
Films directed by Kodi Ramakrishna
Films scored by Mani Sharma
2000s fantasy drama films
Indian fantasy drama films
Films set in Mumbai
Films shot in Mumbai
Films set in Gujarat
Hindu devotional films
2001 drama films